Echinochimaera ("prickly chimera") is an extinct genus of chimaeriform fish, known from the Lower Carboniferous Bear Gulch Limestone in Montana, United States. It is one of the earliest Chimaeriformes known.

Taxonomy 
The genus' name derives from the Greek εχινό (echino) meaning spiny, and chimaera. It is assigned to the order Chimaeriformes.

Species 
The two known Echinochimaera species lived in the Upper Mississippian (Serpukhovian). Fossils of the species were found in the Bear Gulch Limestone in Montana, United States.

Both species have rounded bodies and paddle-like tails as well as large pectoral fins, two dorsal fins and a jaw fused to the braincase. The paddle-like tails indicate that E. meltoni was likely not a predator nor a fast swimmer.

Echinochimaera meltoni 

E. meltoni was first described by Richard Lund, an Adelphi University palaeontologist, in 1977. The fossils found of E. meltoni have shown a great deal of sexual dimorphism, males being found to have a maximum 150mm body length while the maximum body length found in females was only 70mm (juveniles were 13-20mm). In general, the females only grew to about half the size of the males. Males also had four pairs of spikes which may have been used to defend against predators and to identify the fish as male.

There was a relative abundance of immature male fossils found, and that together with the significant sexual dimorphism indicate there was extreme sexual selection among the species.

Echinochimaera snyderi 
E. snyderi was described, like E. meltoni, by Richard Lund. It was described in 1988 based on juvenile specimens, all with a body length under 90mm. E. snyderi differs from E. meltoni in fin detail as well as jaw shape and teeth near the front edge of the face rather than a tooth plate, in mature specimens later found its mature size was found to be larger than E. meltoni.

References

Carboniferous cartilaginous fish
Prehistoric cartilaginous fish genera
Chimaeriformes
Mississippian fish of North America
Fossil taxa described in 1977